Kamatz or qamatz  (alternatively  ) is a Hebrew niqqud (vowel) sign represented by two perpendicular lines (looking like an uppercase T)  underneath a letter. In modern Hebrew, it usually indicates the phoneme  which is the "a" sound in the word spa and is transliterated as a .

Qamatz Qaṭan, Qamatz Gadol, Ḥataf Qamatz

Qamatz Qaṭan vs. Qamatz Gadol

The Hebrew of the late centuries BCE and early centuries of the Common Era had a system with five phonemic long vowels  and five short vowels .

In the later dialects of the 1st millennium CE, phonemic vowel length disappeared, and instead was automatically determined by the context, with vowels pronounced long in open syllables and short in closed ones.  However, the previous vowel phonemes merged in various ways that differed from dialect to dialect:
 In Tiberian Hebrew, which underlies the written system of vowels, short  became  (indicated by ); long  became  (indicated by ); while  and  both merged into an in-between sound  (similar to the vowel in English "caught" without the cot-caught merger), which was indicated by qamatz.

The result is that in Modern Hebrew, the vowel written with qamatz might be pronounced as either [a] or [o], depending on historical origin.  It is often said that the two sounds can be distinguished by context:

Unfortunately, the two varieties of shwa are written identically, and pronounced identically in Modern Hebrew; as a result, there is no reliable way to distinguish the two varieties of qamatz when followed by a vowel marked with a shwa. (In some cases, Biblical texts are marked with a metheg or other cantillation mark that helps to indicate which pronunciation is intended, but this usage is not consistent, and in any case such marks are absent in non-Biblical texts.)

An example of the qamatz qatan is the Modern Hebrew word  ("program").

In practice, however, Modern Hebrew words containing a qamatz qatan do add a vav  to indicate the  pronunciation; hence the "nonstandard" spelling  is common in newspapers and is even used in several dictionaries, for example Rav Milim.

Some books print the  differently, although it is not consistent. For example, in siddur Rinat Yisrael the vertical line of qamatz qatan is longer. In Siddur Sim Shalom, the horizontal line is separated from the bottom. In a book of Psalms used by some Breslov hassidim the qamatz qatan is bolder. In the popular niqqud textbook Niqqud halakha le-maase by Nisan Netser, the qamatz qatan is printed as an encircled qamatz for didactic purposes.

Unicode defines the code point , although its usage is not required.

Ḥaṭaf Qamatz
 is a "reduced qamatz".

Pronunciation and transliteration
The following table contains the pronunciation and transliteration of the different qamatzes in reconstructed historical forms and dialects using the International Phonetic Alphabet. The transcription in IPA is above and the transliteration is below.

The letters bet  and heth  used in this table are only for demonstration. Any letter can be used.

Vowel length comparison
These vowel lengths are not manifested in Modern Hebrew. The short o and long a (qamatz) have the same niqqud. Because of this, the short o is usually promoted to a long o in Israeli writing, written as a vav , for the sake of disambiguation.

By adding two vertical dots (shva) the vowel is made very short.

Unicode encoding

Note: the glyph for QAMATS QATAN may appear empty or incorrect if one applies a font that cannot handle the glyph necessary to represent Unicode character U+05C7. Usually this Unicode character isn't used and is substituted with the similar looking QAMATS (U+05B8).

Niqqud